Samuel Evans Ashong Narh (born March 5, 1943) is a Ghanaian politician and an engineer. He is a former production manager at GHACEM and is a former member of parliament of the Tema East constituency of the Greater Accra Region of Ghana. Ashong Narh was also a former mayor of the Tema east Metropolis.

Early life and education 
Ashong Narh obtained a diploma in mechanical engineering at the Kwame Nkrumah University of Science and Technology in 1996. He then proceeded to the University of Poland where he obtained a Diploma in technology in 1968.

Personal life 
Ashong Narh comes from Tema, Manhean in the Greater Accra Region of Ghana. He is a Christian and a Presbyterian.

References 

Government ministers of Ghana
Ghanaian MPs 2001–2005
20th-century Ghanaian engineers
Kwame Nkrumah University of Science and Technology alumni
People from Tema
Living people
1943 births
Mayors of Tema
Ghanaian Presbyterians